Momanpur may refer to:

 Momanpur, Bhopal, a village in India
 Momanpur, Pakistan, a village in Pakistan